Goodbye is the third album by German musician and producer Ulrich Schnauss.

It was originally released as a ten track album, then re-released on Independiente on 20 Jul 2008 in a revised form with a wider dynamic range and two additional tracks. For the album's 2019 boxset remaster, the tracklist was reordered again.

Track listing

Tracks 10, 11, and 12 are listed separately on the packaging as bonus tracks.

Singles 
"Quicksand Memory EP" (28 May 2007)
"Stars EP" (19 Aug 2008)

References

2007 albums
Domino Recording Company albums
Ulrich Schnauss albums